Christine Bannon-Rodrigues (born November 6, 1966) is an American martial artist, actress, stunt person, and choreographer.

Biography
A student of Don Rodrigues, Bannon-Rodrigues is a 9th degree black belt, she holds 9 World Championships, including consecutive 3-time World Titles at the W.A.K.O. Games.

Bannon-Rodrigues has acted for both film and television, including the feature films Sci-Fighter (aka X-Treme Fighter) and 27 Dresses. Her stunt work can be seen in a number of Hollywood productions, including Underdog, Batman and Robin, and The Next Karate Kid.  Christine has appeared on television in WMAC Masters, and Mortal Kombat: Conquest.

In 2012 Christine did the martial arts choreography for the film Champions of the Deep (2012).

Christine teaches at the Don Rodrigues Karate Academy, where she is a co-owner with Shihan Don Rodrigues.

Filmography

Championships and accomplishments

Kickboxing
WAKO Amateur World Championships
W.A.K.O. World Championships 1991 −55 kg/122 lb semi-contact kickboxing gold medalist 
W.A.K.O. World Championships 1993 −55 kg/122 lb semi-contact kickboxing gold medalist

References
Black Belt Magazine, "Tournament Champs become Cinema Heroes", October 2012

External links
Bio at USADojo.com

1966 births
Living people
American female kickboxers
Bantamweight kickboxers
American female karateka
American wushu practitioners
American film actresses
20th-century American actresses
Actresses from Rhode Island
American television actresses
Sportspeople from Warwick, Rhode Island
21st-century American women